A  (asphalt leg of lamb) is a leg of lamb prepared by wrapping the meat in kraft paper and placing in a bath of hot asphalt. This preparation method is used traditionally in France to celebrate the completion of the structural portion of construction projects or public works.

A recipe for the dish, appears in the 1900 cookbook  ("True Practical Cuisine: Soups, Fish, Beef, Veal, Lamb, Mutton, Pork, Poultry, Game")

"This is a strange cooking method that can be put to good use by workers. I give the recipe as it was passed on to me. In a hot boiler of asphalt, when paving the ground, immerse a leg of lamb wrapped in very strong paper. With the assistance of a stone attached to one end, it will be pulled into the middle of the tar. One hour of cooking gives the meat a particularly excellent flavor. Salt when removed from the heat."

Usage of this cooking method by asphalt workers, in particular, has existed since the end of the 19th century.

References 

French meat dishes
Lamb dishes
Asphalt
Ceremonies in France
Closing ceremonies
19th-century establishments in France
Ceremonial food and drink
Construction in Europe